The Vinland Club is a Canadian drama film that was directed by Benoît Pilon and released in 2020. The film stars Sébastien Ricard as Frère Jean, a priest teaching at a private Roman Catholic school in the Charlevoix region of Quebec in the 1940s who enlists his students in a project to locate archaeological evidence of the ancient Norse settlement of Vinland.

The film's cast also includes Rémy Girard, François Papineau, Fabien Cloutier, Arnaud Vachon, Xavier Huard, Émilie Bibeau, Guy Thauvette, Guy Sprung, and Émile Schneider.

The film was originally slated for release on April 17, 2020, but that was delayed by the shutdown of movie theatres in light of the COVID-19 pandemic in Canada. The film had its world premiere at the Beijing International Film Festival in August 2020 and had its North American premiere later that year at the Abitibi-Témiscamingue International Film Festival on October 31.

Awards and nominations

References

External links

2020 films
2020s historical drama films
Films directed by Benoît Pilon
2020s French-language films
Canadian historical drama films
French-language Canadian films
2020s Canadian films